Balut may refer to:

Places
Balut-e Asadi, a village in Fars Province, Iran
Balut Beyg, a village in Lorestan Province, Iran
Balut Island, a Philippine island and volcano
Baluthupa, a village in Bangladesh

Other uses
Balut (autobiography), an autobiography by Indian writer Daya Pawar
Balut (food), a boiled fertilized egg, a popular food in parts of Asia
Balut (game), a dice game named after the Asian food

See also
Ballute, a parachute-like braking device
Baloot, a card game popular in Persian Gulf-area countries
Balot (disambiguation)